Now Esto Es Musica! Latino 3  was released on October 2, 2007. Unlike the previous two NOW Latino albums, this volume features eighteen tracks rather than twenty and adds songs from the salsa and bachata musical genres.

Track listing
 Ricky Martin – "Pégate" 
 Daddy Yankee feat. Fergie – "Impacto (Remix)" 
 RKM & Ken-Y – "Llorarás" 
 Belinda – "Bella Traición"  
 La 5ª Estación – "Ahora Que Te Vas" 
 Jennifer Lopez – "Qué Hiciste" 
 Hector "El Father" – "Sola" 
 Kumbia All Starz – "Chiquilla" 
 Nelly Furtado feat. Residente Calle 13 – "No Hay Igual (Remix)" 
 Aventura – "Mi Corazoncito"
 RBD – "Tu Amor"
 Tito "El Bambino" feat. Randy – "Siente el Boom" 
 Calle 13 feat. Bajofondo Tango Club & Panasuyo – "Tango del Pecado" 
 Luis Fonsi – "Tu Amor" 
 Juan Luis Guerra – "La Llave de Mi Corazón" 
 David Bisbal feat. Vicente Amigo & Wisin & Yandel – "Torre de Babel (Reggaeton Mix)" 
 Paulina Rubio – "Ayúdame" 
 Marc Anthony – "Que Precio Tiene el Cielo"

Charts

Weekly charts

Year-end charts

References

2007 compilation albums
Latino 03
Spanish-language compilation albums
Latin music compilation albums